The 2011–12 Western Kentucky Hilltoppers men's basketball team represented Western Kentucky University during the 2011–12 NCAA Division I men's basketball season. The Hilltoppers were led by fourth year head coach Ken McDonald for the first 16 games of the season before he was fired and were then led by former assistant and new head coach Ray Harper for the remainder of the year. They played their home games at E. A. Diddle Arena and are members of the East Division of the Sun Belt Conference. They finished the season 16–19, 7–9 in Sun Belt Play to finish in a tie for third place in the East Division. The Hilltoppers were champions of the Sun Belt Basketball tournament to earn the conference's automatic bid into the 2012 NCAA tournament. It was their 22nd tournament appearance and first since 2009. WKU was also the first sub-.500 team to make the NCAA Tournament since Coppin State in 2008. They defeated Mississippi Valley State in the First Four round before falling in the second round to eventual national champion Kentucky. Derrick Gordon made the All-Conference Team; Gordon and Kahil McDonald were selected to the SBC Tournament Team, and George Fant was tournament MVP.

Roster

Schedule

|-
!colspan=9| Exhibition
 
|-
!colspan=9| Regular Season

|-
!colspan=9| 2012 Sun Belt Conference men's basketball tournament

|-
!colspan=9| 2012 NCAA tournament

References

Western Kentucky Hilltoppers basketball seasons
WKU
WKU